Sufa (lit. Storm) is a kibbutz in southern Israel. Located in the Hevel Shalom area of the north-western Negev desert, it falls under the jurisdiction of Eshkol Regional Council.

A border crossing between Israel and the Gaza Strip named after the kibbutz was located nearby, but was closed permanently by Israel in 2008.

Kibbutz
The kibbutz was founded in 1982 by former residents of Sufa, an Israeli settlement in Sinai which was evacuated as part of the Egyptian-Israeli Peace Treaty. Its name is derived from the severe dust storms which occurred in the original settlement. To the north of the kibbutz, where Nirim was between the years 1946–1949, lies the memorial site "Dangur", commemorating the casualties of the Egyptian attack on Nirim and a memorial for the eight fallen soldiers.

Border crossing
The Sufa border crossing was used by Palestinians working on Israeli farms. During the Second Intifada (2000–2005), the border crossing and the military base next to it were subject to several Palestinian attacks, and the crossing was intermittently closed. In October 2007, the crossing was closed, leaving the Kerem Shalom crossing as the only point of entry. In November, despite IDF objections saying it was harder to guard than Kerem Shalom, Deputy Defense Minister Matan Vilnai decided to reopen the crossing. It was then used to transfer humanitarian assistance to the Strip.

In May 2008, the crossing was once again closed following a mortar attack which wounded an IDF soldier. A few days later, thousands of Palestinians protested the Israeli blockade. Six people were reported wounded by the IDF in that incident. On June 1, about forty Israeli farmers protested at the crossing, in a bid to stop the transportation of goods into the Strip despite the ongoing Qassam rocket barrages. As a result, the Sufa border crossing was permanently closed in 2008.

References

External links
Official website 
Sufa Negev Information Center

Kibbutzim
Kibbutz Movement
Populated places established in 1982
Israel–Gaza Strip border crossings
Populated places in Southern District (Israel)
1982 establishments in Israel